Rutherford Medal may refer to:

 Rutherford Medal (Royal Society of New Zealand) of the Royal Society of New Zealand
 Rutherford Memorial Medal of the Royal Society of Canada
 Rutherford Medal and Prize of the Institute of Physics, UK
 Rutherford Memorial Lecture (Royal Society) of the Royal Society